Henry Jamyn Brooks (1839–1925) was a British painter, particularly known for his pictures of meetings and events, in which many individuals are personally identifiable. He painted royalty, and portraits of civic leaders and military people, and was also a photographer.

Personal life 

Brooks was born in 1839.

His son, Sidney Malcolm Wellbye Brooks (born 1874, Abingdon), was a member of the Anglican missionary organisation, the Society for the Propagation of the Gospel in Foreign Parts and was reported murdered in China, during the Boxer Rebellion, on 30 December 1899.

Brooks died in Essex in 1925.

Career 

Among the organisations whose meetings Brooks painted were: The Corporation of Abingdon (1877–1878), Reading Borough Council (1878), the first meeting of London County Council, in the County Hall Spring Gardens (1889) and the Royal College of Surgeons' Court of Examiners (1894).

In 1886, his business address was 7 Trafalgar Studios, Manresa Road, King's Road in south-west London.

His painting Private View of the Old Masters Exhibition, Royal Academy, 1888 features sixty-six people. There are a number of notable contemporary artists in the work, including Sir John Everett Millais, William Holman Hunt, George Richmond, William Powell Frith, Sir Lawrence Alma-Tadema, Frank Holl, Sir Edward Poynter, Sir Philip Burne-Jones, and Sir William Quiller Orchardson. Other notable people are critic John Ruskin (who was not present at the event), banker Alfred de Rothschild, and prime minister William Ewart Gladstone. It also includes a self-portrait. In 1914, he recalled the circumstances in which the work was conceived:

He donated the painting to the National Portrait Gallery in 1919.

On 28 February 1899 he attended Windsor Castle to present to Queen Victoria his paintings of her reception of the chairmen and conveners of county councils and the mayors and provosts of the United Kingdom. The reception had been held at Buckingham Palace in 1897, as part of Victoria's Diamond Jubilee celebrations. He also painted Victoria, near the end of her reign, in a work called Queen Victoria's Last Ceremony, in which she was shown receiving Lord Roberts and his staff on their return from Africa. The painting was exhibited at Graves' Galleries, Pall Mall, in London in June 1901, following her death. The admission charged was one shilling.

29 January 1902 issue of The Tatler reported that Brooks was working on a  picture of the attendees at a first-night of Stephen Phillips' play Ulysses at Her Majesty's Theatre, London, which was to include some 300 portraits, including the Royal Family, nobility, politicians, and many other members of high society. He reportedly sent each of the people to be depicted a postcard on which they were requested to supply details such as hair colour, height and what they were wearing at the event.

His work is in a number of collections, including the National Portrait Gallery, the Royal Institution, the Royal Air Force Museum, the City of London Corporation's Guildhall Art Gallery, Reading Museum, the Hunterian Museum, and Brasenose College, Oxford.

Notes

References

Further reading 
 Bénézit, Emmanuel. Bénézit Dictionary of Artists: English Edition. Originally published in French, in 1911. Paris: Gründ, 2006.
 "Catalog of Recent Acquisitions." Sanders of Oxford. p. 31.
 Complete illustrated catalogue, 1856–1979. 1981. .
 James S. Dearden. John Ruskin: A Life in Pictures. Continuum; 1999. . p. 240.
 Ursula DeYoung. A Vision of Modern Science: John Tyndall and the Role of the Scientist in Victorian Culture. Palgrave Macmillan; 15 February 2011. . p. 201.
 Charlotte Gere. Artistic Circles: Design & Decoration in the Aesthetic Movement. Harry N. Abrams; 1 June 2010. . p. 47.
 Horace A. Laffaye. Polo in Britain: A History. McFarland; 1 January 2012. . p. 146.
 Franny Moyle. Desperate Romantics. John Murray; 8 November 2012. . p. PT185.
 Rethinking Pitt-Rivers. The Pitt Rivers Museum, University of Oxford.
 Royal College of Surgeons of England.  Catalogue of portraits and busts in the Royal College of Surgeons of England with short biographical notices. London: Taylor and Francis, 1892. p. 49.
 James Faure Walker. Painting the Digital River: How an Artist Learned to Love the Computer. Prentice Hall Professional; January 2006. . p. 43, 53, 302.
 Witt Checklist of Painters ca. 1200–1976, London: Witt Library, Courtauld Institute of Art.
 Witt Library authority files, Courtauld Institute of Art [local database]. London, 19??-.

External links 

 

1839 births
1925 deaths
19th-century English painters
English male painters
20th-century English painters
Photographers from Birmingham, West Midlands
People from Birmingham, West Midlands
People from Abingdon-on-Thames
People from Fulham
People from Paddington
People from Canvey Island
20th-century English male artists
19th-century English male artists